Safari Plus Limited is an air charter company based in Dar es Salaam, Tanzania.

Fleet
The Safari Plus fleet consists of the following aircraft (as of November 2021):

References

External links
Official Website

Airlines of Tanzania
Airlines established in 2011
2011 establishments in Tanzania